The Copa Chile 1959 was the 2nd edition of the Chilean Cup tournament. The competition started on November 21, 1959 and concluded on December 22, 1959. Santiago Wanderers won the competition for the first time, beating Deportes La Serena on the final.

Matches were scheduled to be played at the stadium of the team named first on the date specified for each round. From the beginning of the second Round, if scores were level after 90 minutes had been played, an extra time took place.

Calendar

First round

Second round

Quarterfinals

Semifinals

Third-place match

Finals

Top goalscorers
 José Sulantay (Deportes La Serena) 6 goals
 Juan Soto (Colo-Colo) 6 goals
 Héctor Torres (Magallanes) 6 goals

See also
 1959 Campeonato Nacional
 Primera B

References
Revista Estadio (Santiago, Chile) November, December 1959 (revised scores & information)
RSSSF (secondary source, some mistakes in it)

Copa Chile
Chil
1959
Football competitions in Chile